Gnomoniopsis smithogilvyi, known as the chestnut rot fungus, is a species of fungus in the family Gnomoniaceae. It causes chestnuts to rot, preventing their use as food.

References

Gnomoniaceae
Fungal plant pathogens and diseases